Michael John Wise CBE, MC (17 August 1918 – 13 October 2015) was a British academic who served as a professor of geography at the University of London.

Early life
Michael Wise was born in Stafford in 1918, son of Harry Cuthbert Wise and Sarah Evelyn Wise.

Education
After attending Saltley Secondary School, Birmingham, he attended the University of Birmingham where he completed his BA in Geography in 1939. After war service he returned to Birmingham as an assistant lecturer and lecturer, gaining a PhD in 1951.  It was at this point that he met Gordon Warwick, a fellow assistant lecturer, who became a lifelong friend, with Wise being godfather to the latter's daughter. They later collaborated on the British Association Handbook for the Birmingham meeting. St Barnabas, Erdington church register.

War service
During the second world war Wise served in the British Army in Europe and the Middle East, reaching the rank of Major in 1944. He was awarded the Military Cross.

Career
On completion of his PhD in 1951, Wise moved to the London School of Economics as lecturer, becoming Sir Ernest Cassel Reader in Economic geography in 1954 and Professor in 1958.  During the student disturbances of 1968 he defended the treasures of the LSE Map Room and negotiated their exemption from occupation during a sit-in.

Wise served as member, president etc. of many learned societies including the British Association for the Advancement of Science, the Transport Studies Society, International Geographical Union, Geographical Association and Royal Geographical Society.

He died on 13 October 2015 at the age of 97.

Honours
Wise received the RGS Gill Memorial award (1958) and Founder's Medal (1977) and also the Alexander Körōsi Csoma Medal of the Hungarian Geographical Society (1980), the Tokyo Geographical Society Medal (1981) and the Lauréat d’Honneur of the IGU (1984). He received the CBE in 1979. The University of Birmingham awarded him an honorary DSc in 1982. In 2008 his 90th birthday was marked by a gathering of colleagues and former students at [LSE].

References

1918 births
2015 deaths
British Army officers
Military personnel from Staffordshire
Academics of the London School of Economics
Academics of the University of Birmingham
Academics of the University of London
Alumni of the University of Birmingham
British Army personnel of World War II
Commanders of the Order of the British Empire
Fellows of the Royal Geographical Society
People educated at Saltley Grammar School
People from Stafford
Presidents of the International Geographical Union
Presidents of the Royal Geographical Society
Recipients of the Military Cross